Eschatarchia is a monotypic moth genus in the family Geometridae. It contains only one species, Eschatarchia lineata, which is found in Japan, China, Taiwan and Myanmar. Both the genus and species were first described by Warren in 1894.

References

External links

Asthenini